Trześń  is a village in the administrative district of Gmina Niwiska, within Kolbuszowa County, Subcarpathian Voivodeship, in south-eastern Poland.

The village has a population of 682.

References

Villages in Kolbuszowa County